A chumbox or chumbucket is a form of online advertising that uses a grid of thumbnails and captions to drive traffic to other sites and webpages. This form of advertising is often associated with low quality clickbait links and articles. The term derives from the fishing practice of "chumming", the use of fish meat as a lure for fish.

Overview
Chumboxes became popular during the early 2010s. They are often presented to the reader as additional reading, and use headings such as "around the Web" and "you might like." The use of chumboxes became common on many mainstream websites, including those of CNN, Fox News, MSNBC, and USA Today.

The two largest and most well-known providers of chumbox advertising are currently Outbrain and Taboola. In the mid-2010s, the addition of such ad platforms to large journalism-based sites was said to provide over $10 million per year extra revenue. Casey Newton of The Verge concluded that the ad format was likely to be short lived, similar to schemes such as Groupon; though clickthrough on such ads was in the single-digit percentage region (compared to 0.1% for banner ads), this figure was comparable to that early experienced by banner ads – he expected that as with banner ads, users would eventually come to learn of the low utility of such links, and eventually avoid them.

By the mid-to-late 2016, some websites were re-thinking the use of chumboxes due to the negative impact such low-quality links and content had on their brands, despite the additional income from such links. An analysis of images used in advertising of the kind found that 26% used sexually suggestive or "interruptive" images; often the ads had no relation to the article content, and on occasions were inappropriate or offensive, such as one titled "Meet the Women Making Rape Jokes That Are Actually Funny," placed under an article about teenage rape.

ChangeAdvertising.org's "Clickbait Report" analysed 50 high rank news sites and found that over 80% were using such ads, the majority from Taboola or Outbrain. Many were found to be confusing or misleading in their purpose.

An analysis of images and headlines used in such adverts found a number of basic archetypes used: a sexual image in association with location-based advertisement; reverse aging (skin) treatment based, or "miracle cure"; body shock images (e.g. triggering trypophobia); celebrity gossip based; tattoo-based images, including those simulating body horror or orifices; images of pills, and weight loss.

See also
One weird trick

References

Online advertising methods